The chronology of Pre-Columbian Mesoamerica is usually divided into the following eras:

Five Stage Classification

One of the most enduring classifications of archaeological periods & cultures was established in Gordon Willey and Philip Phillips' 1958 book Method and Theory in American Archaeology. They divided the archaeological record in the Americas into 5 phases. These are:
 The Lithic stage
 The Archaic stage
 The Formative stage
 The Classic stage
 The Post-Classic stage

Tabular list

See also
 Archaeogenetics
 Archaeology of the Americas
 History of the Americas
 Genetic history of indigenous peoples of the Americas
 List of archaeological periods – parent page
 List of archaeological periods (North America)
 List of pre-Columbian cultures
 Mesoamerican chronology

References
 

Mesoamerica
Periods